PNS Tippu Sultan may refer to one of the following ships of the Pakistan Navy:

 , the former British O-class destroyer HMS Onslow (G17); acquired by the Pakistan Navy in 1949; served until 1979
 , the former American  USS Damato (DD-871) launched in 1945; acquired by the Pakistan Navy in 1980; scrapped in 1994
 , the former British Type 21 frigate HMS Avenger (F185); acquired by the Pakistan Navy in 1994 and expended as a target in 2020
 ,  a Type 054A/P frigate

Pakistan Navy ship names